Euxoa flavidens is a species of cutworm or dart moth in the family Noctuidae. It is found in North America.

The MONA or Hodges number for Euxoa flavidens is 10758.

References

Further reading

External links

 

Euxoa
Articles created by Qbugbot
Moths described in 1888